The 12th constituency of the Nord is a French legislative constituency in the Nord département.

Description

Following the 2010 redistricting of French legislative constituencies Nord's 12th Constituency was effectively created as a new seat covering the areas once occupied by the 22nd and 24th constituencies in the east of the department.

Christian Bataille of the Socialist Party won the seat comfortably in the second round beating the National Front candidate by 7,000 votes.

Historic Representation

Election results

2022

 
 
 
 
 
 
 
 
|-
| colspan="8" bgcolor="#E9E9E9"|
|-

2017

2012

 
 
 
 
 
|-
| colspan="8" bgcolor="#E9E9E9"|
|-
 
 

 
 
 
 
 
Note - the constituency covered a different area of the department before 2010

2007

 
 
 
 
 
 
 
 
 
 
|-
| colspan="8" bgcolor="#E9E9E9"|
|-

2002

 
 
 
 
 
 
 
 
 
 
|-
| colspan="8" bgcolor="#E9E9E9"|
|-

1997

 
 
 
 
 
 
 
|-
| colspan="8" bgcolor="#E9E9E9"|
|-

References

Sources
 Official results of French elections from 1998: 

12